Ivar Wester (16 December 1892 – 13 September 1967) was a Swedish sports shooter. He competed in the team free rifle event at the 1924 Summer Olympics.

References

External links
 

1892 births
1967 deaths
Swedish male sport shooters
Olympic shooters of Sweden
Shooters at the 1924 Summer Olympics
People from Hudiksvall Municipality
Sportspeople from Gävleborg County
20th-century Swedish people